In the philosophy of space and time, eternalism is an approach to the ontological nature of time, which takes the view that all existence in time is equally real, as opposed to presentism or the growing block universe theory of time, in which at least the future is not the same as any other time. Some forms of eternalism give time a similar ontology to that of space, as a dimension, with different times being as real as different places, and future events are "already there" in the same sense other places are already there, and that there is no objective flow of time.

It is sometimes referred to as the "block time" or "block universe" theory due to its description of space-time as an unchanging four-dimensional "block", as opposed to the view of the world as a three-dimensional space modulated by the passage of time.

The present

In classical philosophy, time is divided into three distinct regions: the "past", the "present", and the "future". Using that representational model, the past is generally seen as being immutably fixed, and the future as at least partly undefined. As time passes, the moment that was once the present becomes part of the past; and part of the future, in turn, becomes the new present. In this way time is said to pass, with a distinct present moment "moving" forward into the future and leaving the past behind. Within this intuitive understanding of time is the philosophy of presentism, which argues that only the present exists. It does not travel forward through an environment of time, moving from a real point in the past and toward a real point in the future. Instead, the present simply changes. The past and future do not exist and are only concepts used to describe the real, isolated, and changing present. This conventional model presents a number of difficult philosophical problems, and seems difficult to reconcile with currently accepted scientific theories such as the theory of relativity.

Special relativity eliminates the concept of absolute simultaneity and a universal present: according to the relativity of simultaneity, observers in different frames of reference can have different measurements of whether a given pair of events happened at the same time or at different times, with there being no physical basis for preferring one frame's judgments over another's. However, there are events that may be non-simultaneous in all frames of reference: when one event is within the light cone of another—its causal past or causal future—then observers in all frames of reference show that one event preceded the other. The causal past and causal future are consistent within all frames of reference, but any other time is "elsewhere", and within it there is no present, past, or future. There is no physical basis for a set of events that represents the present.

Many philosophers have argued that relativity implies eternalism. Philosopher of science Dean Rickles disagrees in some sense, but notes that "the consensus among philosophers seems to be that special and general relativity are incompatible with presentism." Christian Wüthrich argues that supporters of presentism can only salvage absolute simultaneity if they reject either empiricism or relativity. Such arguments are raised by Dean Zimmerman and others, in favor of a single privileged frame whose judgments about length, time and simultaneity are the true ones, even if there is no empirical way to distinguish this frame.

The flow of time

Antiquity 
Arguments for and against an independent flow of time have been raised since antiquity, represented by fatalism, reductionism, and Platonism: Classical fatalism argues that every proposition about the future exists, and it is either true or false, hence there is a set of every true proposition about the future, which means these propositions describe the future exactly as it is, and this future is true and unavoidable. Fatalism is challenged by positing that there are propositions that are neither true nor false, for example they may be indeterminate. Reductionism questions whether time can exist independently of the relation between events, and Platonism argues that time is absolute, and it exists independently of the events that occupy it.

Earlier, pre-Socratic Greek philosopher Parmenides of Elea had posited that existence is timeless and change is impossible (an idea popularized by his disciple Zeno of Elea and his paradoxes about motion).

Middle ages 
The philosopher Katherin A. Rogers argued that Anselm of Canterbury took an eternalist view of time, although the philosopher Brian Leftow argued against this interpretation, suggesting that Anselm instead advocated a type of presentism. Rogers responded to this paper, defending her original interpretation. Rogers also discusses this issue in her book Anselm on Freedom, using the term "four-dimensionalism" rather than "eternalism" for the view that "the present moment is not ontologically privileged", and commenting that "Boethius and Augustine do sometimes sound rather four-dimensionalist, but Anselm is apparently the first consistently and explicitly to embrace the position." Taneli Kukkonen argues in the Oxford Handbook of Medieval Philosophy that "what Augustine's and Anselm's mix of eternalist and presentist, tenseless and tensed language tells is that medieval philosophers saw no need to choose sides" the way modern philosophers do.

Augustine of Hippo wrote that God is outside of time—that time exists only within the created universe.  Thomas Aquinas took the same view, and many theologians agree.  On this view, God would perceive something like a block universe, while time might appear differently to the finite beings contained within it.

Modern period 
One of the most famous arguments about the nature of time in modern philosophy is presented in The Unreality of Time by J. M. E. McTaggart. It argues that time is an illusion. McTaggart argued that the description of events as existing in absolute time is self-contradictory, because the events have to have properties about being in the past and in the future, which are incompatible with each other. McTaggart viewed this as a contradiction in the concept of time itself, and concluded that reality is non-temporal. He called this concept the B-theory of time.

Dirck Vorenkamp, a professor of religious studies, argued in his paper "B-Series Temporal Order in Dogen's Theory of Time" that the Zen Buddhist teacher Dōgen presented views on time that contained all the main elements of McTaggart's B-series view of time (which denies any objective present), although he noted that some of Dōgen's reasoning also contained A-Series notions, which Vorenkamp argued may indicate some inconsistency in Dōgen's thinking.

A. Halliday has attempted to rationalise time by arguing that it is finite. This was founded on the thought that, if an entity has, or is assigned, parts then those parts must be finite. Assembling finite parts must result in a finite whole. Therefore, it follows that past, present and future are finite. It then follows that, as they also form a whole, then the whole of time is finite.

In the simplest case, if time is finite then it is limited. Time is thought of as existing inside of space. If there cannot be a gap between the edge of time and the limits of space, then time fills all of space, ensuring change everywhere. Therefore, time cannot flow if flow demands movement from one point to another?

Quantum physics 
Some philosophers appeal to a specific theory that is "timeless" in a more radical sense than the rest of physics, the theory of quantum gravity. This theory is used, for instance, in Julian Barbour's theory of timelessness. On the other hand, George Ellis argues that time is absent in cosmological theories because of the details they leave out.

Recently, Hrvoje Nikolić has argued that a block time model solves the black hole information paradox.

Objections 

Philosophers such as John Lucas argue that "The Block universe gives a deeply inadequate view of time. It fails to account for the passage of time, the pre-eminence of the present, the directedness of time and the difference between the future and the past." Similarly, Karl Popper argued in his discussion with Albert Einstein against determinism and eternalism from a common-sense standpoint.

A flow-of-time theory with a strictly deterministic future, which nonetheless does not exist in the same sense as the present, would not satisfy common-sense intuitions about time. Some have argued that common-sense flow-of-time theories can be compatible with eternalism, for example John G. Cramer’s transactional interpretation. Kastner (2010) "proposed that in order to preserve the elegance and economy of the interpretation, it may be necessary to consider offer and confirmation waves as propagating in a “higher space” of possibilities.

In Time Reborn, Lee Smolin argues that time is physically fundamental, in contrast to Einstein's view that time is an illusion. Smolin hypothesizes that the laws of physics are not fixed, but rather evolve over time via a form of cosmological natural selection. In The Singular Universe and the Reality of Time, co-authored with philosopher Roberto Mangabeira Unger, Smolin goes into more detail on his views on the physical passage of time. In contrast to the orthodox block universe view, Smolin argues that what instead exists is a "thick present" in which two events in the present can be causally related to each other. Marina Cortês and Lee Smolin also argue that certain classes of discrete dynamical systems demonstrate time asymmetry and irreversibility, which is inconsistent with the block universe interpretation of time.

Avshalom Elitzur vehemently rejects the block universe interpretation of time. At the Time in Cosmology conference, held at the Perimeter Institute for Theoretical Physics in 2016, Elitzur said: "I’m sick and tired of this block universe, ... I don’t think that next Thursday has the same footing as this Thursday. The future does not exist. It does not! Ontologically, it’s not there." Elitzur and Shahar Dolev argue that quantum mechanical experiments such as the Quantum Liar and the evaporation of black holes challenge the mainstream block universe model, and support the existence of an objective passage of time. Elitzur and Dolev believe that an objective passage of time and relativity can be reconciled, and that it would resolve many of the issues with the block universe and the conflict between relativity and quantum mechanics. Additionally, Elitzur and Dolev believe that certain quantum mechanical experiments provide evidence of apparently inconsistent histories, and that spacetime itself may therefore be subject to change affecting entire histories.

In popular culture

In fiction

Ideas related to Eternalism are described in Kurt Vonnegut’s novel, Slaughterhouse-Five. In the context of the novel, the Tralfamadorians are an alien species, members of which experience every point in time simultaneously. A character at one point argues that since all moments exist simultaneously, everyone is always alive-- a claim which implies Eternalism. The protagonist of the story, Billy Pilgrim, additionally lives his life out of sequence. It is stated that each moment of his life exists independent of the others, which is a clause of Eternalism.

Eternalism is also indirectly referenced in the comic book series Watchmen by Alan Moore. At one point, the character Dr. Manhattan describes how he perceives time in a manner which is consistent with Eternalism. He states that, from his perspective, the past, present, and future occur simultaneously. This is evidenced when he speaks about past or future events in the present tense, which is a frequent occurrence. His last line in the series is, "Nothing ends, Adrian. Nothing ever ends."

The science fiction novel The Number of the Beast , by Robert A. Heinlein, explores concepts related to Block Time. One protagonist, the mathematician Dr. Jacob Burroughs, invents a device which navigates through time as one scalar dimension in a six-dimensional universe. The novel unfolds across a variety of parallel worlds. Along with block time, it is implied that there exists a block plenum of innumerable alternate universes, with each being separated by one quantum step along an axis of space-time.

The game Warframe introduces eternalism in the story quest "The New War." The example provided in the game describes a situation in which a girl's parents are trapped in separate cells, but the girl can only save one of them, as the other parent will be killed in response. According to the rules of eternalism, as explained by one of the characters, there will be different versions of reality regarding which parent is saved. The reason provided is that though the girl is assigned to one future, the other is no less real.

See also
 A series and B series
 Arrow of time
 Eternity of the world
 Introduction to special relativity
 Philosophical presentism
 Philosophy of space and time
 Problem of time
 Static interpretation of time
 Strata-cut animation

References

Bibliography
 Smart, Jack. "River of Time". In Anthony Kenny. Essays in Conceptual Analysis. pp. 214–215.
 van Inwagen, Peter (2008). "Metaphysics." Stanford Encyclopedia of Philosophy.

External links
 
 
 
 
 

Philosophy of time
Philosophy of physics
Metaphysical theories